Paul Boundoukou-Latha (1952 – 7 June 2020) was a Gabonese politician and diplomat. He was Gabon's Ambassador to Morocco from 1989 to 1993, Ambassador to the United States and Mexico from 1993 to 2001, and Ambassador to Germany from 2001 to 2006. He was Minister-Delegate under the Deputy Prime Minister for the Environment from January 2009 to October 2009, Minister-Delegate under the Minister of the Economy, Trade, Industry, and Tourism from October 2009 to January 2011, and he was appointed as Minister-Delegate under the Minister of Foreign Affairs in January 2011. In June 2013, he was appointed as Chairman of the Gabonese Housing Bank.

Diplomatic career
Following political studies in France at the University of Poitiers, Boundoukou-Latha graduated in 1979. Back in Gabon, he was placed in charge of the Europe Studies Department at the Ministry of Foreign Affairs in 1983, and he was Director of International Organizations and Multilateral Cooperation from 1984 to 1986. Later, he was Gabon's Ambassador to Morocco from 1989 to 1993.

Boundoukou-Latha was appointed as Gabonese Ambassador to the United States on 23 June 1993 and presented his credentials on 3 September 1993; he served concurrently as Ambassador to Mexico. Later, in December 2000, he was instead appointed as Ambassador to Germany; that was considered something of a demotion. He was recalled from Germany and replaced by Jean-Claude Bouyobart in May 2006.

Political career
Boundoukou-Latha joined the Gabonese Union for Democracy and Development (UGDD), an opposition party founded by Zacharie Myboto in 2005, and held the post of UGDD Political Adviser. Myboto and Boundoukou-Latha are brothers. Later, Boundoukou-Latha accepted an appointment to the government, along with UGDD Secretary-General Sylvestre Ratanga, on 14 January 2009; he was named Minister-Delegate under the Deputy Prime Minister for the Environment, Sustainable Development, and the Protection of Nature, Georgette Koko. He and Ratanga accepted their appointments without the approval of the UGDD, and they were immediately expelled from the party on 15 January. Deriding the appointments, the UGDD expressed doubt that Koko would give Boundoukou-Latha any meaningful responsibility.

On 25 July 2009, following the death of President Omar Bongo in June 2009, Boundoukou-Latha announced his support for the candidate of the Gabonese Democratic Party (PDG), Ali Bongo, in the 30 August 2009 presidential election. Bongo won the election, and after taking office as President he moved Boundoukou-Latha to the position of Minister-Delegate under the Minister of the Economy, Trade, Industry, and Tourism on 17 October 2009. He was one of two ministers-delegate assigned to that ministry, sharing the responsibility with Françoise Assengone Obame. He also was elected President of the ACP council of ministers as Minister-Delegate under the Minister of the Economy, Trade, Industry and Tourism.

Boundoukou-Latha joined the PDG on 6 March 2010.

References

1952 births
2020 deaths
Gabonese diplomats
Gabonese expatriates in France
Gabonese politicians
Gabonese Democratic Party politicians
Government ministers of Gabon
Ambassadors of Gabon to the United States
Ambassadors of Gabon to Mexico
Ambassadors of Gabon to Germany
Ambassadors of Gabon to Tunisia
Ambassadors of Gabon to Morocco
Officers of the Ordre national du Mérite
21st-century Gabonese people